Javor Mills (born May 11, 1979) is a former American football defensive end. He played for the Jacksonville Jaguars in 2002.

References

1979 births
Living people
American football defensive ends
Auburn Tigers football players
Jacksonville Jaguars players
Cologne Centurions (NFL Europe) players